Gleimia is a genus of bacteria from the family of Actinomycetaceae.

References

Actinomycetales
Bacteria genera
Taxa described in 2018